Markas is a male Lithuanian given name that is derived from Marcus.

Its derivations are Markauskas and Markevičius (family name).

People 
 Markas Beneta (born 1993), footballer
 Markas Luckis (1905–1973), Argentine chess player of Lithuanian descent
 Bronius Markauskas (born 1960), politician, member of Seimas
  (born 1966), liberal politician, engineer, member of Seimas
  (born 1954), politician, member of Seimas
 Gvidonas Markevičius (born 1969), basketball player and coach
  (born 1962), lawyer, politician, and former Interior Minister of Lithuania (2001–2004)
 Rory Markas (1955–2010), American sportscaster

Lithuanian masculine given names